Ivand may refer to:
 a village in Giulvăz municipality, Romania
Ivand, Iran, a village in East Azerbaijan Province, Iran
Ivand, Lorestan, a village in Lorestan Province, Iran
Eyvand (disambiguation)